Johnsburg is a village in McHenry County, Illinois. It is a northwestern suburb of Chicago with a population of 6,355 as of the 2020 U.S. census.

History
The area that came to be known as Johnsburg was first settled in 1841, five years after the founding of McHenry County, by immigrant families escaping religious persecution and oppressive social conditions in the Eifel region of Germany, predominantly the Mayen-Koblenz." (The congregation is known today as St. John the Baptist.) They built their first church in 1842, a simple log cabin that also functioned as a school and meeting hall. The first priest to serve this new congregation was delivered there by friendly Native Americans who found him lost in the woods of Wisconsin. The church served the community until 1850, when a larger frame church was built to replace it. Construction on a third church, built in the Gothic style, began in 1867. This church took thirteen years to complete and was the pride of the Johnsburg community until it was destroyed by a fire on February 19, 1900. Many of the early settlers' grave markers were also destroyed by the fire. The present St. John the Baptist church was dedicated in 1902.

By 1990, a group of citizens living in this unincorporated area of McHenry County had come to fear that their community, known for over 100 years as Johnsburg, would be swallowed or divided by surrounding municipalities. They turned to their neighbors in Sunnyside, an adjacent village with which they shared a library, schools, and other services, for solutions. (Sunnyside had been incorporated in 1956.) Sunnyside and Johnsburg leaders struck an informal agreement that allowed Sunnyside to annex the surrounding area, thereby tripling its size, but required it to rename itself Johnsburg. After Sunnyside completed the annexation in 1992, the Sunnyside Village Board legally renamed its municipality to Johnsburg.

Geography
Johnsburg is located at  (42.385796, -88.235942).

Johnsburg lies within the watershed of the Fox river.

Major streets
  Richmond Road
 Ringwood Road
 McCullom Lake Road
 Johnsburg Road
 Spring Grove Road
 Chapel Hill Road
 Bay Road
 Riverside Drive

Public transportation
As of October 2018, a Pace bus route between the nearby municipalities of Crystal Lake, McHenry, and Fox Lake also serves Johnsburg.  The closest rail transit is the McHenry commuter rail station, one of the termini of Metra's Union Pacific/Northwest Line.

Demographics

As of the census of 2000, there were 5,391 people, 1,760 households, and 1,501 families residing in the village. The racial makeup of the village was 98.83% White, 0.13% African American, 0.06% Native American, 0.19% Asian, 0.17% from other races, and 0.63% from two or more races. Hispanic or Latino of any race were 1.52% of the population.

There were 1,760 households, out of which 44.9% had children under the age of 18 living with them, 73.9% were married couples living together, 7.1% had a female householder with no husband present, and 14.7% were non-families. 11.8% of all households were made up of individuals, and 3.9% had someone living alone who was 65 years of age or older. The average household size was 3.06 and the average family size was 3.32.

In the village, the population was spread out, with 30.6% under the age of 18, 7.0% from 18 to 24, 28.3% from 25 to 44, 26.4% from 45 to 64, and 7.6% who were 65 years of age or older. The median age was 37 years. For every 100 females, there were 102.1 males. For every 100 females age 18 and over, there were 99.4 males.

The median income for a household in the village was $69,864, and the median income for a family was $73,491. Males had a median income of $51,832 versus $30,893 for females. The per capita income for the village was $27,582. About 1.1% of families and 1.3% of the population were below the poverty line, including 2.1% of those under age 18 and none of those age 65 or over.

Schools
Four schools are part of District 12, which serves students in the Villages of Johnsburg and Ringwood and in the Pistakee Highlands. Johnsburg High School serves grades 9 - 12; known as the "Skyhawks." Johnburg Junior High School, the "Wildcats," serves 6 - 8. Up until 2016, James C. Bush Elementary School served grades 3 and 4 (grade 5 was located at JJHS). Johnsburg Elementary School, the "Bloodhounds", now serves grades 3 - 5. Johnsburg Ringwood Primary Center also known as "The Ringwood Rockets" serves children from PreK - grade 2. The start of the 2008-09 school year brought the steepest enrollment in District 12 schools in five years, when 93 fewer students enrolled.

Cultural references 
Tom Waits wrote a song called "Johnsburg, Illinois" in 1982. He included it on his album of the following year Swordfishtrombones. It is a short, poignant love poem to his wife, Kathleen Brennan, who grew up in the village.

The country music duo The Handsome Family (formerly of Chicago) referred to Johnsburg in the title track of their album In the Air, in the lyrics "Last night at the bridge to Johnsburg I swerved down a dead end street" and "Those wild dogs brought back that smell of falling snow and the girl who lives in Johnsburg across a bridge I cannot cross."

Notable people 

 Kathleen Brennan, musician, songwriter, record producer, and artist.
C. J. Fiedorowicz, retired tight end for the Houston Texans of the NFL. Graduated from Johnsburg High School. He went to college at the University of Iowa.
 Clay Guida ("The Carpenter,"), mixed martial artist currently competing in the UFC, lived in Johnsburg
 Chuck Hiller, second baseman (first National League player to hit a grand slam homer in World Series History - 1962), coach, and manager with the San Francisco Giants, New York Mets, Philadelphia Phillies, Pittsburgh Pirates
 Sam Saboura, former host and stylist of ABC's Extreme Makeover and current host of TLC's Something Borrowed, Something New, moved to Johnsburg as a teen and graduated from Johnsburg High School

References

External links
Johnsburg official website

Chicago metropolitan area
German-American history
Luxembourgian-American history
Populated places established in the 1840s
Villages in Illinois
Villages in McHenry County, Illinois